Anne Helene Gjelstad (9 May 1956 in Oslo) is a Norwegian photographer and fashion designer. As a photographer, she mainly works with portraits, fashion and documentary, but also with interiors, products and lifestyle.

Gjelstad is educated from Norwegian National Academy of Craft and Art Industry from 1982. She then had her own fashion studio for design and production of exclusive models. For 5½ years, she also had her own knitting production in Estonia for the Norwegian and international market.

In 2009, she completed at two-years course in digital photography at Bilder Nordic School of Photography. She has also participated in workshops with Morten Krogvold, Mary Ellen Mark, Joyce Tenneson and William Ropp.

In 2009, she worked at Mary Ellen Mark Studio in New York City for a period of time.

Gjelstad is currently working on a project in Kihnu, an island in the Baltic Sea considered Europe's last matriarchy. Gjelstad says she was first exposed to women from Kihnu during a Nordic Knitting Symposium. She later said that out of 35 women she photographed, only 10 are still alive.


Exhibitions
Collective Exhibitions
 Stå ikkje dær å frys on Det norske teatret, Oslo, December 2008
 På en tråd in Sandvika, Bærum, August 2009
 Fotografiets dag on Preus Photo Museum, August 2009
 Zoom Norway in Ljubljana, Slovenia 2010
 Oaxaca XV exhibition curated by Mary Ellen Mark – Centro Fotografico Alvarez Bravo; Mexico 12 March – 31 May 2011
 Intangible Cultural Heritage photo exhibition, National Art Museum of China, 17–26 May 2014
 The Lonka Project, Willy-Brandt-Haus, Berlin, 27 Januar 2021 – 11 April 2021

Solo Exhibitions
SCAPES -Norwegian kids, teens & nature: Exhibition on tour in Estonia on an invitation from the Norwegian Embassy in Tallinn in 2010 og 2011
Tallinn: Deco Galerii, 11–29 May 2010
Tõstamaa: Tõstamaa Secondary School (mansion and museum), 8–30 June 2010
Haapsalu: Haapsalu City Hall, 3–31 August 2010
Pärnu: Villa Artis Galerii, 3 September – 7 October 2010
Narva: Narva Main Library, 17 October – 30 November 2010
Elva: Tartu County Museum, 11 January  – 28 February 2011
Hiiumaa: Kärdla Culture Centre, 4–21 March 2010
 SCAPES – Norwegian kids, teens & nature, at Fotografiens Hus, Oslo, 31 March – 30 April 2011
 MY FOCUS, Fotografiens Hus, Oslo 1–18 December 2011
Big heart, strong hands – a portrait of the older women on Kihnu and Manija islands; Estonia
Kihnu museum, 24 April – 30 September 2011
Pärnu:: The Museum of Modern Art 5–31 October 2011
Tallinn: The Estonian Parliament at Toompea 16 November – 15 December 2011
Rakvere: Rakvere Culture Centre
Tartu: Estonian National Museum
Narva: Narva Museum
Hiiumaa: Hiiuma Museum
 Matriarchy, Side Gallery, Newcastle upon Tyne, 29 october – 23 December 2022

Awards 
 Letter of appreciation, Estonian Ministry of Foreign Affairs, 26 November 2020, «for the promotion of Estonia’s cultural heritage as well as the exciting and unique life of Kihnu and Manilaid in Norway and the world.»
 Gold winner in category Photographers Project in Gullsnitt 2010 for pictures of old ladies in Kihnu and Manilaid; Estonia
 The annual competitions by the Norwegian Association of Photographers in 2008 2009, and 2011.
 Portrait of the year 2017
 Represented Norway in World Photographic Cup 2018 og 2019
 Gold medal portrait in the annual competitions by the Norwegian Association of Photographers in 2018

Books
 Alt om maskinstrikking 1994  (in Norwegian)
 Norsk Strikkedesign: A Collection from Norway's Foremost Knitting Designers (co-writer), 2002
 Scapes, Norwegian kids, teens & nature
 MY FOCUS
 Lekre masker og lekne sting, photo, Gyldendal Norsk Forlag, 2013, 
 Vakker strikk til alle årstider, photo, Gyldendal Norsk Forlag, 2014, 
 Big Heart, Strong Hands, text in English and Norwegian, Dewi Lewis Publishing, 2020, 2. edition 2021.

References

External links
 Home Page (English)
 About her knitted collection
  Stå ikkje dær å frys – images
 About her solo exhibition foto.no (in Norwegian)

Photographers from Oslo
Norwegian fashion designers
Artists from Oslo
1956 births
Living people
Norwegian women photographers
Norwegian women fashion designers